Summer House is the debut studio album by Gold Motel, released on June 1, 2010 on Good As Gold Records.

Track listing

References

2010 albums